Karin Lisa von Hippel (born February 1965) is the current Director-General of the Royal United Services Institute.

Hippel was Chief of Staff to General John R. Allen while he was Special Presidential Envoy for the Global Coalition to Counter-ISIL (Islamic State of Iraq and the Levant).

Publications
Von Hippel is the author of Democracy by Force: US Military Intervention in the Post-Cold War World (2000).

Education 
Von Hippel holds a PhD from the London School of Economics, an MSt from Oxford, and a BA from Yale.

References 

Living people
1965 births
21st-century British women writers